Qaleh-ye Sheykh (also Romanized as Qal‘eh-ye Sheykh and Qal‘eh Sheykh; also known as Ghal‘eh Sheikh) is a village in Howmeh-ye Sharqi Rural District, in the Central District of Ramhormoz County, Khuzestan Province, Iran. At the 2006 census, its population was 224, in 49 families.

References 

Populated places in Ramhormoz County